Senator Everett may refer to:

Charles H. Everett (1855–1947), Wisconsin State Senate
Edward Everett (1794–1865), U.S. Senator from Massachusetts from 1853 to 1854